Pleurocera catenaria is a species of freshwater snail with a gill and an operculum, an aquatic gastropod mollusk in the family Pleuroceridae.

This species is endemic to southern Virginia, North Carolina, South Carolina, Tennessee, Georgia.

Subspecies 
Subspecies of Pleurocera catenaria include:
 Pleurocera catenaria catenaria (Say, 1822)
 Pleurocera catenaria dislocata (Ravenel, 1834)

Synonyms 
Synonyms of Pleurocera catenaria catenaria include:

 Elimia albanyensis, common name black-crest elimia, it was listed as vulnerable species in 1996 and as least concern in 2011.
 Pleurocera boykiniana, common name flaxen elimia, it was listed as vulnerable species in 1996.
 Pleurocera caelatura
 Pleurocera christyi
 Pleurocera darwini
 Pleurocera interrupta, - common name knotty elimia, it was listed as vulnerable species in 1996.
 Pleurocera lecontiana
 Pleurocera mutabilis
 Pleurocera postelli, common name broken hornsnail.
 Pleurocera suturalis
 Pleurocera viennaensis

References

Pleuroceridae
Gastropods described in 1822
Taxonomy articles created by Polbot
Taxobox binomials not recognized by IUCN